The Miners' Next Step was an economic and political pamphlet produced in 1912 calling for coal miners through their lodges, to embrace syndicalism and a new 'scientific' trade unionism. The pamphlet was written by the 'Unofficial Reform Committee' a group of syndicalist and socialists involved in the Plebs' League and the Cambrian Combine strike of 1910-11. The main author is recognised as Noah Ablett.

Background 
Ablett had embraced syndicalism while studying at Ruskin College, and was a founding member of the Plebs' League. On his return to Rhondda, Ablett found himself in connection with like-minded socialists William Mainwaring, Noah Rees, Will Hay and A.J. Cook. In 1911 the Cambrian Combine dispute ended with the Tonypandy Riot, which in turn caused ill feelings towards the then Liberal government after Home Secretary Winston Churchill ordered the deployment of the British Army to suppress the workers.

Contents 
The Miners' Next Step was a sustained critique of the style of union leadership shown by the likes of William "Mabon" Abraham who had been seen as too liberal in his dealings with the coalowners during such disputes as the Welsh coal strike of 1898. The pamphlet called for Decentralization for Negotiating, Centralization for Fighting, The use of the Irritation Strike, Joint Action by Lodges, Unifying the men by unifying demands, The Elimination of the Employer, against the Nationalization of Mines and for Industrial Democracy.

Among the demands listed in the pamphlet were the introduction of a minimum wage, the introduction of a seven-hour working day, for unions to be controlled directly by their members, and for wider use of strike action. It opposed the nationalisation of mines, saying that the government would still run them in a way that exploited workers, calling for direct control by workers instead, through the election of managers. The pamphlet also offered a critique of the concentration of power in leadership, stating that "All leaders become corrupt, in spite of their own good intentions" as growth of power in the members of an organisation would diminish the prestige and titles of the leaders, pushing those leaders towards opposing a decentralisation of power.

Analysis 
Sociologist Hilary Wainwright has stated that the pamphlet put "the stress on trade union members as independent thinkers rather than 'the masses'," and that an "understanding of collectivity as relationships between individuals as creative social subjects underpinned their concept of solidarity."

References

External links
 The Miners' Next Step Library of Wales

Political manifestos
1912 non-fiction books
Pamphlets
Miners' labour disputes in the United Kingdom
1912 in politics
Syndicalism
Socialism in Wales